East to West was a Contemporary Christian music duo from Cleveland, Tennessee, formed in 1993.

Background
Neal Coomer and Jay DeMarcus met in Cleveland, Tennessee, at Lee College (now Lee University) and decided to form a Christian pop group along the lines of Level 42 or Go West. They released two albums, East to West in 1993 and North of the Sky, in 1995, which hit No. 16 on Billboard's Top Christian Albums chart that same year. The group toured in the United States with Al Denson and 4Him before breaking up in 1997. DeMarcus later became a member of the group Rascal Flatts.

The group's Christian radio hits included "Welcome to the Next Level" (#3, 1994), "Prince of Peace" (#1, 1994), "Hungry for You" (#3, 1995), "Heart on the Line" (#16, 1995), "This Time Around" (#5, 1995), "Still in Love" (#9, 1995), "Live Like I'm Leaving" (#19, 1996), and "Talk to Me" (#15, 1996).

Discography
East to West (Benson Records, 1993)
North of the Sky (Benson, 1995)

References

Musical groups from Tennessee
American Christian musical groups
Musical groups established in 1993
1993 establishments in Tennessee